Tridadi Stadium is a multi-use stadium in Sleman, Indonesia.  It is currently used mostly for football matches and is used as the home stadium for PSS Sleman and Sleman United.  The stadium has a capacity of 12,000 people.

Tournament

References

Sports venues in Indonesia
Football venues in Indonesia
Buildings and structures in the Special Region of Yogyakarta